East Lynne is a 1921 American silent drama film directed by Hugo Ballin and starring Edward Earle, Mabel Ballin and Henry G. Sell. Now considered a lost film, it is one of numerous film versions of Ellen Wood's 1861 Victorian novel East Lynne.

Cast
 Edward Earle as Archibald Carlyle
 Mabel Ballin as Isabel Vane
 Gladys Coburn as Barbara Hare
 Gilbert Rooney as Richard Hare
 Henry G. Sell as Francis Levison
 Nellie Parker Spaulding as Miss Cornelia
 Doris Sheerin as Afy Hallijohn

References

Bibliography
 Munden, Kenneth White. The American Film Institute Catalog of Motion Pictures Produced in the United States, Part 1. University of California Press, 1997.

External links
 

1921 films
1921 drama films
1920s English-language films
American silent feature films
Silent American drama films
American black-and-white films
Films directed by Hugo Ballin
Films based on British novels
Films distributed by W. W. Hodkinson Corporation
1920s American films